Smolnik may refer to the following places:

Bulgaria
Smolnik, Bulgaria, a village in Karnobat Municipality, Burgas Province

Slovakia
Smolník, Gelnica District, a village and municipality in the Košice Region
Smolník, Snina District, a former village in the Prešov Region

Slovenia
Smolnik, Ruše, a dispersed settlement in the Styria region
Smolnik, Dobrova–Polhov Gradec, a dispersed settlement in the Upper Carniola region

Poland
Smolnik, Lower Silesian Voivodeship (south-west Poland)
Smolnik, Bieszczady County in Subcarpathian Voivodeship (south-east Poland)
Smolnik, Sanok County in Subcarpathian Voivodeship (south-east Poland)
Smolnik, Greater Poland Voivodeship (west-central Poland)
Smolnik, Warmian-Masurian Voivodeship (north Poland)
Smólnik, Kuyavian-Pomeranian Voivodeship (north-central Poland)